Shapuree, Shahpori, Shah Parir, Shapura, or Shinmabyu Island is located in Bangladesh at the mouth of the Naf River, a maritime-boundary between Bangladesh and Myanmar. Historically, it was claimed by the British during the First Anglo-Burmese War. The island forms an extension of the peninsula of Teknaf Upazila.

The island plays an important role as a likely landing place for boatloads of refugees crossing the Naf River from Myanmar, attempting to reach Bangladesh.

References

External links
 On the Irrawaddy a Story of The First Burmese War 
 Memoir of the three campaigns of Major-General Sir Archibald Campbell's army By Sir Henry Havelock at Google Books
  - Map of Teknaf Upazila, showing "Shah-Parir Island"

Islands of Bangladesh